Events in the year 1964 in Spain.

Incumbents
President / Caudillo: Francisco Franco
Vice President: Agustín Muñoz Grandes
President of the Cortes Españolas: Alejandro Rodríguez de Valcárcel
Secretary of the Movimiento Nacional Council: José Solís
President of the Supreme Court: José Castán Tobeñas
Cortes Españolas: 7th

Events

Births
January 5 - Miguel Ángel Jiménez
January 7 - Mar Carrera
April 2 - Lucía.
July 9 - Arturo Daudén Ibáñez.
August 21 – Alfonso Lacadena, Mesoamerican epigraphist and academic (d. 2018)

Deaths

 January 21 - Luis Martín Santos
 February 13 - Paulino Alcántara
 March 9 - José Capuz
 April 29 - Wenceslao Fernández Flórez

See also
 List of Spanish films of 1964

References

 
Years of the 20th century in Spain
1960s in Spain
Spain
Spain